Katsucon is an annual three-day anime convention held during February at the Gaylord National Resort & Convention Center in National Harbor, Maryland. It is traditionally held in February over Presidents Day weekend and was previously held in various locations around Virginia and Washington, D.C.  The basis of the convention's name is not clear, as "katsu" in the Japanese language has various meanings, including pork.

Programming
The convention typically offers anime music video screenings, an art show, artist alley, charity auction, costume contests, cosplay chess, dealers room, game shows,  formal ball, karaoke, a maid cafe, masquerade, musical performances, panels, rave, workshops, video gaming, and video screenings. Katsucon has Japanese Culture programming known as the Japanese Cultural Institute. Katsucon's charity events in 2012 benefited the American Cancer Society, Anime Aid, and Cherry Tree Maintenance Endowment Fund.

History
Katsucon started in 1995 at the Holiday Inn Executive Center, and moved to locations around the Washington metropolitan area after its third year due to growth. In 2002 the convention had a membership cap of 7,000 people, unsuccessfully attempted to move to the Baltimore Marriott Waterfront, and in 2003 returned to the Hyatt Regency Crystal City. Katsucon ran for extra days in 2003 due to hundreds of attendees being trapped by road closures during the North American blizzard of 2003. Guests and staff ran panels and opened video rooms. Due to growth, the convention in 2005 moved to the Marriott Crystal Gateway and Sheraton Crystal City from the Hyatt Regency Crystal City. The hotels were unconnected and one had construction ongoing, which caused problems including the first two floors of the hotel having no heat, long dealers room lines, and panels being held in larger hotel rooms. The convention from 2006 to 2008 was located at the Omni Shoreham Hotel, but in 2007 suffered crowd control and logistics problems. For 2009 the convention returned to the Hyatt Regency Crystal City and suffered from overcrowding, even with an attendance cap of 6,000. Katsucon 2009 had over 300 volunteers on staff.

The convention for several years had been experiencing problems with convention space, and in 2006 began discussions about moving to the Gaylord. In 2010 Katsucon moved to the Gaylord National Resort & Convention Center and the February 9–10, 2010 North American blizzard occurred. Attendees traveling to the convention encountered icy conditions and congested traffic, with the weather preventing delivery of the cons badges on Thursday, delaying registration until Friday. The convention in 2011 released a revised Fan Art policy due to controversy over its wording. Due to an incident where a sex offender made contact with a minor at Katsucon 2010, the convention announced that it would attempt to check its pre-registration lists against sex offender databases, and deny attendance to possible threats. In 2012, the convention hosted the United States preliminary round for the World Cosplay Summit. The winner from the twenty-two teams entered was Coconut Bubble Sex Cosplay. The masquerade began seating late and was an hour late to start. Due to the convention's attendance growth they ran out of badges in 2012 and returned to the Gaylord in 2013. In 2013, the convention hosted the United States Eastern Regional qualifier for the World Cosplay Summit. The dealers room in 2013 suffered from crowding on Sunday, and they had to limit the number of attendees who entered.

The February 11–17, 2014 North American winter storm occurred on the days before the convention, causing travel disruptions for attendees. The convention did not share the Gaylord with other events in 2014 and made the dealers' room larger. Registration experienced significant delays due to staff and organization issues. Katsucon again held events for the World Cosplay Summit. The dress code was changed by the convention and hotel for 2016. Katsucon 2021 was cancelled due to the COVID-19 pandemic. Katsucon 2022 had COVID-19 policies that required masks and vaccination.

Event history

Notes

See also

List of anime conventions
MAGFest

References

Other Related News Articles
Let's Revisit A 1995 Anime Convention Kotaku, Retrieved 21 June 2022

External links
Katsucon Website

Anime conventions in the United States
Recurring events established in 1995
1995 establishments in Virginia
Annual events in Maryland
Festivals in Maryland
Culture of Washington, D.C.
Tourist attractions in Prince George's County, Maryland
Conventions in Maryland